Neodythemis campioni is a species of dragonfly in the family Libellulidae. It is found in Cameroon, Liberia, and Sierra Leone. Its natural habitats are subtropical or tropical moist lowland forests and rivers.

References

Libellulidae
Odonata of Africa
Insects of West Africa
Insects of Cameroon
Least concern biota of Africa
Taxonomy articles created by Polbot